is a Japanese professional wrestler currently working as a freelancer and preponderently for the Japanese promotions DDT Pro-Wrestling and Wrestling of Darkness 666.

Professional wrestling career

DDT Pro-Wrestling (2017–present)
Takeda made his debut in DDT Pro-Wrestling in late 2017 in the "DNA" series. However, his notable work began at DDT Dramatic Nerima The Fighter, an event promoted February 3, 2018, where he teamed up with Daiki Shimomura and Yuki Ueno in a losing effort against Shuten Doji (Kota Umeda, Masahiro Takanashi and Yukio Sakaguchi) as a result of a six-man tag team match.

Takeda is known for competing in various of the promotion's signature pay-per-views. His first event was the Judgement 2018: DDT 21st Anniversary on March 25, 2018, where he teamed up with Kota Umeda and Yuki Ueno to defeat Shuten-dōji (Kudo, Masahiro Takanashi and Yukio Sakaguchi) to win the KO-D 6-Man Tag Team Championship. 

After an almost four-year hiatus with the company, Takeda returned and joined the unit of "Pheromones" and challenged former tag team partner Yuki Ueno to a match for the latter's DDT Universal Championship. At Wrestle Peter Pan 2022 on August 25, Takeda teamed up with his stablemates Danshoku Dino and Yuki Iino to defeat Yuji Hino, Yukio Naya and Super Sasadango Machine and Disaster Box (Toru Owashi and Kazuki Hirata) and Antonio Honda. At DDT God Bless DDT 2022 on October 23, he unsuccessfully challenged Ueno for the DDT Universal Championship. At Never Mind 2022 on December 29, Takeda is scheduled to team up with his stablemates Danshoku Dino, Yuki Iino and Yumehito Imanari in a Losing unit must disband match against Akito, Shunma Katsumata, Osamu Nishimura and Shinichiro Kawamatsu.

Big Japan Pro Wrestling (2018–present)
Takeda oftenly makes appearances for the deathmatch promotion Big Japan Pro Wrestling. His most notable ones were part of the promotion's top annual tournaments. On the finals of the 2022 Ikkitousen Strong Climb, he teamed up with Kota Sekifuda and Tatsuhiko Yoshino to defeat Chicharito Shoki, Kosuke Sato & Shinya Ishida. On the thirteenth night of the 2022 Saikyo Tag League from October 17, Takeda teamed up with Takuho Kato and Tatsuhiko Yoshino in a losing effort against Kazumi Kikuta, Ryota Hama and Yasufumi Nakanoue as a result of a six-man tag team match.

Wrestling of Darkness 666 (2019–present)
Takeda made his debut in Wrestling of Darkness 666 at 666 Vol. 90/Shinjuku 2-Chome Shinobu Debut 15th Anniversary Memorial on June 6, 2019, where he teamed up with Fuminori Abe, Taro Yamada and Konaka and competed in a Four-way eight-man tag team match won by Banana Senga, Hiroaki Taniguchi, Guts Ishijima and Yanagwa, and also involving Akkun Ohashi, Jun Kasai, Masashi Takeda and Takayuki Ueki, and Nene Dai, Onryo, Shinobu and Yuko Miyamoto. On the same night, he competed forthe second time as he won a pants battle royal involving the same opponents as in the precedent match. 666 and Ice Ribbon co-promoted the 666 Vol. 99 Halloween, an event which took place on November 8, 2020, where Takeda competed on two separate occasions. In first of them he defeated dropped the Triangle Ribbon Championship which he captured one week earlier to Ram Kaicho in a three-way match also involving Fuminori Abe, and in the second one, he competed in a battle royal won by Taro Yamada and also involving notable opponents such as Risa Sera, Suzu Suzuki, Hiragi Kurumi, Mochi Miyagi, Maika Ozaki and others. Takeda is also known for competing in the world title scene as he unsuccessully faced Konaka for the 666 Chaos Openweight Championship at 666 Vol. 115 on April 2, 2022.

Championships and accomplishments
DDT Pro-Wrestling
KO-D 6-Man Tag Team Championship (1 time) – with Yuki Ueno and Kota Umeda
Japan Indie Awards
Best Unit Award (2022) – with Pheromones
Ice Ribbon
Triangle Ribbon Championship (1 time)
Mobius
Kin No Fundoshi Championship (1 time, current)
Total Triumph Team
TTT Indie Unified Six Man Tag Team Championship (1 time) – with Garlin Shoe Perros B and Syuou Fujiwara
Wrestling of Darkness 666
Shinjuku Ni-chōme Pro-Wrestling ILNP Championship (1 time, current)

References

1991 births
Living people
Japanese male professional wrestlers
People from Iwate Prefecture
Sportspeople from Iwate Prefecture
21st-century professional wrestlers